Sechrist Ridge is a narrow rock spur,  long, descending northeast from the central ridge just east of Mount Evans and terminating  east of Mount Bevilacqua, in the Saint Johns Range. It was named by the Advisory Committee on Antarctic Names in 2007 after Daniel Robert Sechrist, a U. S. Geological Survey (USGS) geographer from 1980 involved in traditional mapping, digital mapping and mapping research; from 2004, Manager of the U.S. Antarctic Resource Center at the USGS in Reston, VA; and a member of the USGS Survey team deployed to the McMurdo Dry Valleys from November to December 2004.

References

Ridges of Victoria Land
McMurdo Dry Valleys